Macondo is a fictional town in the works of Gabriel García Márquez. 

Macondo may also refer to:

 Macondo (film), a 2014 Austrian film
 Macondo (star), or HD 93083, in the constellation Antlia
 Macondo (tree), or Cavanillesia platanifolia, a tree in Central and South America
 Macondo, Malanje, a commune in Angola, Africa
 Macondo, Moxico, a commune in Angola, Africa
 Macondo Awards, given by the Colombian Academy of Cinematography Arts and Sciences
 Macondo Prospect, an offshore oil drilling block in the Gulf of Mexico
 Macondo Writers Workshop, a writing workshop founded by Sandra Cisneros

See also
 McOndo, a Latin American literary movement
 McOndo (book), the 1996 literary anthology that spawned the McOndo movement